Seoul, the capital and largest city in South Korea, accounts for only 0.6% of the country's total land area, yet it is home to around 19% of the population. The population density in Seoul demands a great deal of the city's transportation systems, which are regarded by many as among the best and most advanced in the world. Seoul is very well connected by its subway and bus systems, and the city is also very supportive of pedestrian foot travel. In 2006 it won the Sustainable Transport Award.

Airports

There are two airports that serve Seoul. Gimpo International Airport, formerly in Gimpo but annexed to Seoul in 1963, was the only airport for Seoul from its original construction during the Korean War. Multiple airports were built in and around Seoul immediately before, during, and after the war. The most famous was on Yeouido, which once served as the country's gateway to the world.

Upon opening in March 2001, Incheon International Airport on Yeongjong island in Incheon changed the role of Gimpo Airport significantly. Incheon is now responsible for almost all international flights. Following the opening of Incheon, Gimpo started only serving domestic flights, but has since started opening limited routes to major East Asian cities, such as Tokyo (Haneda Airport), Osaka (Kansai International Airport), Beijing (Beijing-Capital Airport), Shanghai (Shanghai–Hongqiao Airport), Taipei (Taipei–Songshan Airport).

Meanwhile, Incheon International Airport has become, along with Hong Kong and Singapore, a major transportation centre for East Asia.  Following its opening in 2001, the airport opened a 3rd runway as well as a concourse extension in 2008, as well as Terminal 2 in 2018, with additional expansions currently under construction. Incheon International Airport has also frequently been voted amongst the best airports in the world, by Skytrax and Airports Council International.

Incheon and Gimpo are linked to Seoul and the rest of the country by highways, as well as urban rail service. The Incheon International Airport Railroad (or AREX, and styled as A'REX) station is located in the Transport Centre adjacent to the main terminal building provides urban rail services to Gimpo Airport and Seoul. In addition, the Incheon Airport Maglev also operates from the airport. As for Gimpo Airport, besides the AREX line, it is also connected to the Seoul Metropolitan Subway, as Gimpo Airport Station offers services on Line 5, Line 9 and the Gimpo Goldline.

Bus

There are four types of buses:

Seoul has many big intercity/express bus terminals. These buses connect Seoul to cities all around Korea. Major bus terminals include
Seoul Express Bus Terminal in Seocho-gu
Central City in Seocho-gu
Seoul Nambu Terminal, also in Seocho-gu
Dongseoul Bus Terminal in Gwangjin-gu
Sangbong Terminal in Jungnang-gu

Subway

Seoul has 22 subway lines that interlink every district of the city with one another and with the surrounding area. The majority of the population now uses the public transportation system due to its convenience and low cost. With more than 8 million passengers a day, Seoul has one of the busiest subway systems in the world. Despite this, it is highly regarded for its efficiency, its ease of navigation, its timeliness, and for the allure of all the shops and attractions that are present inside the subway system itself.

Taxi

There are two tiers of taxis - Regular (일반 택시, Ilban taxi), and Deluxe (모범 택시, Mobeom taxi).

Regular taxis start at 3800 won for the first two kilometers and are metered at 100 won every 132 meters, which equates to about 758 won per kilometer. If the taxi is going less than 15 km per hour, an additional charge of 100 KRW per 31 seconds is added to the fare. A 20% surcharge is added between midnight and 4 am. These are typically white or silver in color but also can be seen in yellow

Deluxe taxis start at 6500 won for the first three kilometers and are metered at 200 won every 151 meters, which equates to about 1325 won per kilometer. If the taxi is going less than 15 km per hour, an additional charge of 200 KRW per 36 seconds is added to the fare. Their name could also be translated as "Model Taxi" as their service should be an example of what a proper taxi is. Deluxe taxis do not have nightly surcharges.

International taxis 20% more expensive than Regular, Deluxe taxi. They speak English.

Seoul city council announced Seoul Regular Taxi will be repainted. They selected colour called Seoul Orange; look like similar orange or mud yellow. They are going to complete the painting until 2016.

Train

Seoul is connected to every major city in South Korea by railroad. Seoul is also linked to most major Korean cities by the KTX bullet train which features a normal operation speed of more than 300 km/h, making commuting between cities extremely convenient for commuters and tourists. Major railroad stations include:
Seoul Station, Jung-gu - Gyeongbu line (KTX/ITX-Saemaul/Mugunghwa-ho), Gyeongui line (Saemaul/Commuter)
Yongsan Station, Yongsan-gu - Honam line (KTX/ITX-Saemaul/Mugunghwa), Jeolla/Janghang lines (Saemaul/Mugunghwa)
Yeongdeungpo Station, Yeongdeungpo-gu - Gyeongbu/Honam/Janghang lines (ITX-Saemaul/Mugunghwa)
Cheongnyangni Station, Dongdaemun-gu - Gyeongchun/Jungang/Yeongdong/Taebaek lines (Mugunghwa)
In addition, Suseo station, in Gangnam District, was scheduled to open in late 2016, and offer KTX service on the newly built Suseo High Speed Railway.

Paying for Travel 

The most common form of payment that seamlessly works for the public buses and subways in Seoul is the Tmoney transportation card. It is purchasable for 2,500 won from machines at each subway station, as well as from most prominent convenience stores in Seoul. Money is able to be loaded onto the card, and then the card is tapped to a sensor whenever you enter or exit a bus or subway station, with the proper fare being deducted from the card's balance. Many taxis also accept the Tmoney card; those that do will often have a Tmoney logo showing on their vehicle.

International tourists have an alternative card that they can purchase for 4,000 won: the KOREA TOUR CARD. This card works very similarly to the Tmoney card, but it also provides discounts to many popular tourist attractions.

Transportation cards are not required to travel around Seoul, as cash and credit cards can also be used to buy tickets for each individual mode of transportation, though this requires buying a new ticket each time you travel. Additionally, transportation cards give slight discounts on travel fares and allow up to four transfers between Seoul subways and/or buses with no additional charges.

Foreign visitors also have the option to purchase a Korea Rail Pass from KORAIL (Korea Railroad Corporation) if they plan to travel by train a lot. The Korea Rail Pass allows individuals to ride on any supported train within the timeframe that the card is purchased for without any extra fees.

See also

References

Transport in South Korea
Transport in Seoul